Alain Crepin (born 28 February 1954) is a Belgian saxophonist, composer, music educator and conductor.

Crepin was born in Mettet near Dinant. He began his studies for saxophone, cello and piano at the Music Academy of Dinant. He studied at the Royal Conservatory of Brussels, and studied under François Daneels, Roland Cardon, Yvon Ducène and Jacques Leduc

From 1975 to 1981 he was solo saxophonist in Musik Corps of the Gendarmerie and from 1981 to 1983 he also worked as a saxophonist in the Large Band of the Belgian Guides in Brussels. In 1984 he became conductor the band Chasseurs Ardennais. In 1985 he became music director of the Band of the Belgian Air Force. He has performed with the saxophone quartet Dinant.

From 1986-1997 he was vice president of the International Association for the Promotion of the Saxophone.  He was also professor of saxophone at the University of Gap, France and in Alicante, Spain. Since 1981 he has been a professor for saxophone at the Royal Conservatory of Music Brussels.

As a composer, he has written numerous works for symphonic bands and orchestras and as a soloist or composer has featured on over 60 albums.

Works

 1991 Relâche
 1991 Temptations
 2008 Marche de l'Ecole Royal des Sous-Officiers
 150 ans plus tard (Cercle Royal Musical d'Aubange
 200th Jubilee march
 Ad Multos Annos
 Air d'automne
 Aircodos
 Atmosphères
 A Tribute to Sax for Alto Saxophone and Band
 Balade en Périgord
 Bayaderie
 Bij ons in Kee Bie
 C.Q.F.D.
 De 3 à 1000
 Diversions
 Emotions
 Enjoy your Life
 Equinoxe
 Falcon and wolf
 Friendship's Hymn
 Fusions Majeures
 Prelude & Allegro
 Moderato
 Maestoso & Allegro
 Gauloiseries
 Greetings from Jersey
 Bouley Bay
 Rozel Bay
 St Hélier
 Hacherade
 Honor and gallantry
 In the Sky of Wincrange
 La Légende de Rolende
 Le Beau levant
 Lean on the ground
 Les cuirassiers
 Marche de l'Eso
 Millénaire 3
 Muziek voor een prinselijke geboorte
 Night before
 Notes en Rag
 Rencontres
 Poire Belle Helene
 Polichinelle
 Proud to serve
 Relache
 Rencontres
 Rhapsody for Berlare
 Running in the Croix-Scaille
 KSOO Saffraanberg
 Sax for two
 Sax in the city
 Saxflight
 Saxs en parallèle
 Silhouette
 Suite Tastevinesque
 Sunray
 Synergies
 Taïaut-Taïaut
 Temptations
 The white Bison
 Towards success
 Up to Quality

References

1954 births
Living people
Belgian composers
Male composers
Belgian conductors (music)
Belgian male musicians
Male conductors (music)
Belgian saxophonists
People from Mettet
Royal Conservatory of Brussels alumni
Academic staff of the Royal Conservatory of Brussels
21st-century saxophonists
21st-century conductors (music)
21st-century male musicians